FLBB may refer to:

Fédération Luxembourgeoise de Basketball (FLBB)
Fédération Libanaise de Basketball (FLBB) or the Lebanese Basketball Federation
The Fake Leather Blues Band (FLBB)